Lawrence Badash (May 8, 1934, Brooklyn – August 23, 2010, Santa Barbara, California) was an American professor of the history of physical sciences, specializing in the history of physics, particularly the history of nuclear physics and nuclear weapons.

Education and career
Badash graduated in 1956 with a B.S. in physics from Rensselaer Polytechnic Institute, where he was a Reserve Officers' Training Corps (ROTC) student. After serving three years as a naval aviator, he became a graduate in the physics department of Yale University but soon switched to the history of science. He became Derek de Solla Price's first doctoral student. Badash received his Ph.D. in 1964 and his Ph.D. thesis was eventually published in 1979 as the monograph Radioactivity in America: Growth and Decay of a Science. He was a NATO Postdoctoral Science Fellow at the University of Cambridge. In the history department of the University of California, Santa Barbara, he taught the history of the physical sciences. He joined the department in 1966 and retired as professor emeritus in 2002.

Badash was a Guggenheim Fellow for the academic year 1984–1985. He was elected in 1984 a Fellow of the American Association for the Advancement of Science]] (AAAS) and in 1987 a Fellow of the American Physical Society. He served as president of the Santa Barbara chapter of the American Civil Liberties Union ACLU from 1982 to 1988 and from 1996 to 1999.

His doctoral students include Jacob Darwin Hamblin.

Selected publications

Articles

Books
 
 
  (pbk reprint of 1980 original)

References

External links
 
  (audio)

1934 births
2010 deaths
American historians of science
Historians of nuclear weapons
Historians of physics
Rensselaer Polytechnic Institute alumni
Yale University alumni
University of California, Santa Barbara faculty
Fellows of the American Association for the Advancement of Science
Fellows of the American Physical Society